WQFL-CA was a religious television station in Rockford, Illinois, broadcasting locally on channel 8. Founded July 28, 1987, the station was owned by the Family Values Organization, who previously owned sister-stations WQFL (FM) and WGSL. The station's license was cancelled and its call sign deleted from the Federal Communications Commission's database on March 10, 2009.

External links
 Query the FCC's TV station database for WQFL-CA

QFL-CA
Defunct television stations in the United States
1987 establishments in Illinois
2009 disestablishments in Illinois
Television channels and stations established in 1987
Television channels and stations disestablished in 2009
QFL-CA